is a former Japanese football player and manager. He played for Japan national team.

Club career
Soejima was born in Saga on July 26, 1959. After graduating from high school, he joined Yanmar Diesel in 1978. After reserve team in 2 season, he was promoted top team in 1980. In 1980, the club won the champions in Japan Soccer League and he was selected Best Eleven. The club also won 1983 and 1984 Emperor's Cup. In 1991, he moved to Division 2 club Sumitomo Metal and played in 1 season. He retired in 1992.

National team career
On June 9, 1980, Soejima debuted for Japan national team against Hong Kong. He played 3 games for Japan in 1980.

Coaching career
After retirement, Soejima started coaching career at Kashima Antlers (former Sumitomo Metal) in 1992. He moved to Gamba Osaka in 1996. In 1998, he returned to Cerezo Osaka (former Yanmar Diesel) and became a manager in 2000. He was sacked in August 2001. He managed his local club Sagan Tosu in 2002 and Vissel Kobe in 2003. In 2005, he returned to Cerezo Osaka and managed youth team until 2008. He moved to Kataller Toyama and became a coach. In 2010, he moved to Thespa Kusatsu and managed until 2012. In 2015, he moved to Thailand and became a manager Ayutthaya.

Club statistics

National team statistics

Managerial statistics

References

External links
 
 Japan National Football Team Database

1959 births
Living people
Association football people from Saga Prefecture
Japanese footballers
Japan international footballers
Japan Soccer League players
Cerezo Osaka players
Kashima Antlers players
Japanese football managers
J1 League managers
J2 League managers
Cerezo Osaka managers
Sagan Tosu managers
Vissel Kobe managers
Thespakusatsu Gunma managers
Association football midfielders